Date Line Pakistan  is a live news show on PTV News (Pakistan Television News), the state channel of Islamic Republic of Pakistan. It is a 1 hour 20 minute show starting at 5.30 pm PKT.`It is aired from the Islamabad centre PTV NEWS CHAGHI studios.

Format 
It has the following format:
Headlines (regarding current news: international, national, sports news)
the engagements of the Prime Minister and President of Pakistan
current news and live news updates of the country
International news
Documentaries and reports made by reporters
Court proceedings
Sports news updates

Anchors 
Zubair Ahmed Siddiqui
Rizwan Raunaq
Dr. Anita Raja
Hadia Zulqarnain

External links 
 PTV News official site

Television news in Pakistan
Pakistan Television Corporation original programming